Galina Yevgenyevna Gorokhova (born 31 August 1938) is a Russian and former Soviet retired fencer and five-time Olympic medalist, as well as a nine-time world gold medalist. She is also the coach of the Russian Olympic fencing team.

She is a laureate of the national sports award of the Ministry of Sport of Russia, in the nomination "Epoch in Sport".

References

1938 births
Living people
Sportspeople from Moscow
Communist Party of the Soviet Union members
Honoured Coaches of Russia
Honoured Masters of Sport of the USSR
Merited Coaches of the Soviet Union
Recipients of the Order "For Merit to the Fatherland", 3rd class
Recipients of the Order "For Merit to the Fatherland", 4th class
Recipients of the Order of the Red Banner of Labour
Soviet female foil fencers
Russian female foil fencers
Fencers at the 1960 Summer Olympics
Fencers at the 1964 Summer Olympics
Fencers at the 1968 Summer Olympics
Fencers at the 1972 Summer Olympics
Olympic fencers of the Soviet Union
Olympic gold medalists for the Soviet Union
Olympic silver medalists for the Soviet Union
Olympic bronze medalists for the Soviet Union
Olympic medalists in fencing
Medalists at the 1960 Summer Olympics
Medalists at the 1964 Summer Olympics
Medalists at the 1968 Summer Olympics
Medalists at the 1972 Summer Olympics